Galtee may refer to:
 Galtee Mountains
 A former name of Empire Jonquil